Roots is an unincorporated community and census-designated place (CDP) in Blair County, Pennsylvania, United States. It was first listed as a CDP prior to the 2020 census.

The CDP is in northwestern Blair County, in the center of Antis Township. It sits on Pennsylvania Route 865, which leads southeast  to Bellwood and northwest up the Allegheny Front  to Blandburg. Roots is on the north side of Bells Gap Run, which flows southeast off the Allegheny Front and joins the Little Juniata River at Bellwood.

References 

Census-designated places in Blair County, Pennsylvania
Census-designated places in Pennsylvania